
Edgar Röhricht (16 June 1892  – 11 February 1967) was a German general during World War II who commanded the LIX. corps.  He was a recipient of the Knight's Cross of the Iron Cross. Röhricht was surrendered to the Allied troops in 1945 and was held until 1947.

Awards and decorations

 Knight's Cross of the Iron Cross on 15 May 1944 as Generalleutnant and commander of 95. Infanterie-Division

References

Citations

Bibliography

 

1892 births
1967 deaths
People from Lubawka
People from the Province of Silesia
German Army generals of World War II
Generals of Infantry (Wehrmacht)
Prussian Army personnel
German Army personnel of World War I
Recipients of the clasp to the Iron Cross, 1st class
Recipients of the Gold German Cross
Recipients of the Knight's Cross of the Iron Cross
German prisoners of war in World War II held by the United Kingdom
Reichswehr personnel